FK Babuna was a football club from village of Martolci near Veles, North Macedonia. The club currently playing in the OFS Veles league.

History
The club was founded in 1971.

References

External links
Club info at MacedonianFootball 
Football Federation of Macedonia 

Babuna
Association football clubs established in 1971
1971 establishments in the Socialist Republic of Macedonia
Čaška Municipality